Durang is a surname. People with that name include:

Charles Durang (1796–1870), American dancer and actor
Christopher Durang (b. 1949), American playwright
Edwin Forrest Durang (1829–1911), American architect
Ferdinand Durang (c. 1785–1831), American actor, first to publicly perform the "Star-Spangled Banner"
John Durang (1768–1822), early American dancer
"Durang's Hornpipe", a dance and tune named for John Durang